Carnival Queen is a 1937 American crime film directed by Nate Watt and written by James Mulhauser and Harold Buckley. The film stars Robert Wilcox, Dorothea Kent, Hobart Cavanaugh, G. Pat Collins, Harry Tyler, Ernest Cossart, David Oliver, Billy Wayne, Jonathan Hale and Raymond Brown. It was released on October 3, 1937, by Universal Pictures.

Plot

Cast
Robert Wilcox as Art Calhoun
Dorothea Kent as Marion Prescott
Hobart Cavanaugh as Professor Sylva
G. Pat Collins as Bert MacGregor
Harry Tyler as Fingers
Ernest Cossart as Spaulding
David Oliver as Chuck
Billy Wayne as Hanlin
Jonathan Hale as Robert Jacoby
Raymond Brown as Constable
Jimmy O'Gatty as Nick
Frank Lackteen as Ala Ben Ala
Jack Rube Clifford as Deputy Constable 
David Takahashi as Kyra

References

External links
 

1937 films
American crime films
1937 crime films
Universal Pictures films
Films directed by Nate Watt
American black-and-white films
1930s English-language films
1930s American films